The 20821/20822 Santragachi - Pune Humsafar Express  is a Premium Humsafar Express train of the Indian Railways connecting Santragachi in West Bengal and Pune in Maharashtra . It is currently being operated with 20821/20822 train numbers on a weekly basis.

Loco Link
This route is fully electrified and runs from end to end with Santragachi based WAP 7 locomotive.

Coach Composition 

The trains is completely 3-tier AC sleeper trains designed by Indian Railways with features of LED screen display to show information about stations, train speed etc. and will have announcement system as well, Vending machines for tea, coffee and milk, Bio toilets in compartments as well as CCTV cameras.

Service 
It averages 65 km/hr as 20821 Humsafar Express starts on Saturday and covering 2058 km in 31 hrs 45 mins & 65 km/hr as 20822 Humsafar Express starts on Monday covering 2058 km in 32 hours 20 mins.

Stoppage

Rake Sharing
The train shares its rake with 20827/20828 Jabalpur-Santragachi Humsafar Express.

See also 
 Humsafar Express
 Santragachi railway station
 Pune railway station

Notes

External links 
Route info
Route info

Rail transport in Howrah
Transport in Pune
Humsafar Express trains
Rail transport in Maharashtra
Rail transport in West Bengal
Railway services introduced in 2016